Charles Matthews Mackall (July 29, 1903 – December 24, 1991) was a college football player and golfer.

University of Virginia
He was a prominent guard for the Virginia Cavaliers of the University of Virginia On the 100th anniversary of Virginia football he said "I never would have thought Virginia football would get as big as it is today."

1926
Mackall was elected captain of its 1926 team. He led the Southern Conference in field goals in 1926 with four. Mackall was selected  All-Southern.

Golf
He won the Virginia state amateur golf championship in 1927.

References

American football guards
All-Southern college football players
Virginia Cavaliers football players
Players of American football from Washington, D.C.
American male golfers
1903 births
1991 deaths